Myosin-Ib is a protein that in humans is encoded by the MYO1B gene.

References

Further reading